Pre-Islamic Arabia refers to the Arabian Peninsula before the emergence of Islam in 610 CE.

Some of the settled communities developed into distinctive civilizations.  Information about these communities is limited and has been pieced together from archaeological evidence, accounts written outside of Arabia, and Arab oral traditions which were later recorded by Islamic historians. Among the most prominent civilizations were the Thamud civilization, which arose around 3000 BCE and lasted to around 300 CE, and the earliest Semitic civilization in the eastern part was Dilmun, which arose around the end of the fourth millennium and lasted to around 600 CE. Additionally, from the second half of the second millennium BCE, Southern Arabia was the home to a number of kingdoms such as the Sabaeans, Minaeans, and Eastern Arabia was inhabited by Semitic speakers who presumably migrated from the southwest, such as the so-called Samad population. From 106 CE to 630 CE northwestern Arabia was under the control of the Roman Empire, which renamed it Arabia Petraea. A few nodal points were controlled by Iranian Parthian and Sassanian empires.

Pre-Islamic religions in Arabia included Arabian indigenous polytheistic beliefs, ancient Semitic religions (religions predating the Abrahamic religions which themselves likewise originated among the ancient Semitic-speaking peoples), various forms of Christianity, Judaism, Samaritanism, and Mandaeism, Manichaeism, Zoroastrianism, and rarely Buddhism.

Studies

Scientific studies of Pre-Islamic Arabs starts with the Arabists of the early 19th century when they managed to decipher epigraphic Old South Arabian (10th century BCE), Ancient North Arabian (6th century BCE) and other writings of pre-Islamic Arabia. Thus, studies are no longer limited to the written traditions, which are not local due to the lack of surviving Arab historians' accounts of that era; the paucity of material is compensated for by written sources from other cultures (such as Egyptians, Greeks, Romans, etc.), so it was not known in great detail. From the 3rd century CE, Arabian history becomes more tangible with the rise of the Ḥimyarite, and with the appearance of the Qaḥṭānites in the Levant and the gradual assimilation of the Nabataeans by the Qaḥṭānites in the early centuries CE, a pattern of expansion exceeded in the Muslim conquests of the 7th century. Sources of history include archaeological evidence, foreign accounts and oral traditions later recorded by Islamic scholars—especially in the pre-Islamic poems—and the Ḥadīth, plus a number of ancient Arab documents that survived into medieval times when portions of them were cited or recorded. Archaeological exploration in the Arabian Peninsula has been sparse but fruitful; and many ancient sites have been identified by modern excavations. The most recent detailed study of pre-Islamic Arabia is Arabs and Empires Before Islam, published by Oxford University Press in 2015. This book collects a diverse range of ancient texts and inscriptions for the history especially of the northern region during this time period.

Prehistoric to Iron Age
Ubaid period (5300 BCE) – could have originated in Eastern Arabia.
Umm Al Nar culture (2600–2000 BCE)
Sabr culture (2000 BCE)
Wadi Suq Culture (1900–1300 BCE)
Lizq/Rumaylah = Early Iron Age (1300–300 BCE)
Samad Period Late Iron Age (c. 100 BCE–c.300 CE)
Recent Pre-Islamic Period (c. 150 BCE–c. 325 CE)

Magan, Midian, and ʿĀd

 Magan is attested as the name of a trading partner of the Sumerians. It is often assumed to have been located in Oman.
 The A'adids established themselves in South Arabia (modern-day Yemen), settling to the east of the Qahtan tribe. They established the Kingdom of ʿĀd around the 10th century BCE to the 3rd century CE.

The ʿĀd nation were known to the Greeks and Egyptians. Claudius Ptolemy's Geographos (2nd century CE) refers to the area as the "land of the Iobaritae" a region which legend later referred to as Ubar.

The origin of the Midianites has not been established. Because of the Mycenaean motifs on what is referred to as Midianite pottery, some scholars including George Mendenhall, Peter Parr, and Beno Rothenberg have suggested that the Midianites were originally Sea Peoples who migrated from the Aegean region and imposed themselves on a pre-existing Semitic stratum. The question of the origin of the Midianites still remains open.

Overview of major kingdoms 

The history of Pre-Islamic Arabia before the rise of Islam in the 610s is not known in great detail. Archaeological exploration in the Arabian peninsula has been sparse; indigenous written sources are limited to the many inscriptions and coins from southern Arabia. Existing material consists primarily of written sources from other traditions (such as Egyptians, Greeks, Persians, Romans, etc.) and oral traditions later recorded by Islamic scholars. Many small kingdoms prospered from Red sea and Indian Ocean trade. Major kingdoms included the Sabaeans, Awsan, Himyar and the Nabateans.

The first known inscriptions of the Kingdom of Hadhramaut are known from the 8th century BC. It was first referenced by an outside civilization in an Old Sabaic inscription of Karab'il Watar from the early 7th century BC, in which the King of Hadramaut, Yada`'il, is mentioned as being one of his allies.

Dilmun appears first in Sumerian cuneiform clay tablets dated to the end of 4th millennium BC, found in the temple of goddess Inanna, in the city of Uruk. The adjective Dilmun refers to a type of axe and one specific official; in addition, there are lists of rations of wool issued to people connected with Dilmun.

The Sabaeans were an ancient people speaking an Old South Arabian language who lived in what is today Yemen, in south west Arabian Peninsula; from 2000 BC to the 8th century BC. Some Sabaeans also lived in D'mt, located in Eritrea and northern Ethiopia, due to their hegemony over the Red Sea. They lasted from the early 2nd millennium to the 1st century BC. In the 1st century BC it was conquered by the Himyarites, but after the disintegration of the first Himyarite empire of the Kings of Saba' and dhu-Raydan the Middle Sabaean Kingdom reappeared in the early 2nd century. It was finally conquered by the Himyarites in the late 3rd century.

The ancient Kingdom of Awsan with a capital at Hagar Yahirr in the wadi Markha, to the south of the wadi Bayhan, is now marked by a tell or artificial mound, which is locally named Hagar Asfal. Once it was one of the most important small kingdoms of South Arabia. The city seems to have been destroyed in the 7th century BC by the king and mukarrib of Saba Karib'il Watar, according to a Sabaean text that reports the victory in terms that attest to its significance for the Sabaeans.

The Himyar was a state in ancient South Arabia dating from 110 BC. It conquered in c. 25 BC, Qataban in c. 200 AD and Hadramaut c. 300 AD. Its political fortunes relative to Saba changed frequently until it finally conquered the Sabaean Kingdom around 280 AD. It was the dominant state in Arabia until 525 AD. The economy was based on agriculture.

Foreign trade was based on the export of frankincense and myrrh. For many years it was also the major intermediary linking East Africa and the Mediterranean world. This trade largely consisted of exporting ivory from Africa to be sold in the Roman Empire. Ships from Himyar regularly traveled the East African coast, and the state also exerted a considerable amount of political control of the trading cities of East Africa.

The Nabataean origins remain obscure. On the similarity of sounds, Jerome suggested a connection with the tribe Nebaioth mentioned in Genesis, but modern historians are cautious about an early Nabatean history. The Babylonian captivity that began in 586 BC opened a power vacuum in Judah, and as Edomites moved into Judaean grazing lands, Nabataean inscriptions began to be left in Edomite territory (earlier than 312 BC, when they were attacked at Petra without success by Antigonus I). The first definite appearance was in 312 BC, when Hieronymus of Cardia, a Seleucid officer, mentioned the Nabateans in a battle report. In 50 BC, the Greek historian Diodorus Siculus cited Hieronymus in his report, and added the following: "Just as the Seleucids had tried to subdue them, so the Romans made several attempts to get their hands on that lucrative trade."

Petra or Sela was the ancient capital of Edom; the Nabataeans must have occupied the old Edomite country, and succeeded to its commerce, after the Edomites took advantage of the Babylonian captivity to press forward into southern Judaea. This migration, the date of which cannot be determined, also made them masters of the shores of the Gulf of Aqaba and the important harbor of Elath. Here, according to Agatharchides, they were for a time very troublesome, as wreckers and pirates, to the reopened commerce between Egypt and the East, until they were chastised by the Ptolemaic rulers of Alexandria.

The Lakhmid Kingdom was founded by the Lakhum tribe that immigrated out of Yemen in the 2nd century and ruled by the Banu Lakhm, hence the name given it. It was formed of a group of Arab Christians who lived in Southern Iraq, and made al-Hirah their capital in (266). The founder of the dynasty was 'Amr and the son Imru' al-Qais converted to Christianity. Gradually the whole city converted to that faith. Imru' al-Qais dreamt of a unified and independent Arab kingdom and, following that dream, he seized many cities in Arabia.

The Ghassanids were a group of South Arabian Christian tribes that emigrated in the early 3rd century from Yemen to the Hauran in southern Syria, Jordan and the Holy Land where they intermarried with Hellenized Roman settlers and Greek-speaking Early Christian communities. The Ghassanid emigration has been passed down in the rich oral tradition of southern Syria. It is said that the Ghassanids came from the city of Ma'rib in Yemen. There was a dam in this city, however one year there was so much rain that the dam was carried away by the ensuing flood. Thus the people there had to leave. The inhabitants emigrated seeking to live in less arid lands and became scattered far and wide. The proverb "They were scattered like the people of Saba" refers to that exodus in history. The emigrants were from the southern Arab tribe of Azd of the Kahlan branch of Qahtani tribes.

Eastern Arabia

The sedentary people of pre-Islamic Eastern Arabia were mainly Aramaic, Arabic and to some degree Persian speakers while Syriac functioned as a liturgical language. In pre-Islamic times, the population of Eastern Arabia consisted of Christianized Arabs (including Abd al-Qays), Aramean Christians, Persian-speaking Zoroastrians and Jewish agriculturalists. According to Robert Bertram Serjeant, the Baharna may be the Arabized "descendants of converts from the original population of Christians (Aramaeans), Jews and ancient Persians (Majus) inhabiting the island and cultivated coastal provinces of Eastern Arabia at the time of the Arab conquest". Other archaeological assemblages cannot be brought clearly into larger context, such as the Samad Late Iron Age.

Zoroastrianism was also present in Eastern Arabia. The Zoroastrians of Eastern Arabia were known as "Majoos" in pre-Islamic times. The sedentary dialects of Eastern Arabia, including Bahrani Arabic, were influenced by Akkadian, Aramaic and Syriac languages.

Dilmun

The Dilmun civilization was an important trading centre which at the height of its power controlled the Persian Gulf trading routes. The Sumerians regarded Dilmun as holy land. Dilmun is regarded as one of the oldest ancient civilizations in the Middle East. The Sumerians described Dilmun as a paradise garden in the Epic of Gilgamesh. The Sumerian tale of the garden paradise of Dilmun may have been an inspiration for the Garden of Eden story. Dilmun appears first in Sumerian cuneiform clay tablets dated to the end of fourth millennium BCE, found in the temple of goddess Inanna, in the city of Uruk. The adjective "Dilmun" is used to describe a type of axe and one specific official; in addition there are lists of rations of wool issued to people connected with Dilmun.

Dilmun was an important trading center from the late fourth millennium to 1800 BCE. Dilmun was very prosperous during the first 300 years of the second millennium. Dilmun's commercial power began to decline between 2000 BCE and 1800 BCE because piracy flourished in the Persian Gulf. In 600 BCE, the Babylonians and later the Persians added Dilmun to their empires.

The Dilmun civilization was the centre of commercial activities linking traditional agriculture of the land with maritime trade between diverse regions as the Indus Valley and Mesopotamia in the early period and China and the Mediterranean in the later period (from the 3rd to the 16th century CE).

Dilmun was mentioned in two letters dated to the reign of Burna-Buriash II (c. 1370 BCE) recovered from Nippur, during the Kassite dynasty of Babylon. These letters were from a provincial official, Ilī-ippašra, in Dilmun to his friend Enlil-kidinni in Mesopotamia. The names referred to are Akkadian. These letters and other documents, hint at an administrative relationship between Dilmun and Babylon at that time. Following the collapse of the Kassite dynasty, Mesopotamian documents make no mention of Dilmun with the exception of Assyrian inscriptions dated to 1250 BCE which proclaimed the Assyrian king to be king of Dilmun and Meluhha. Assyrian inscriptions recorded tribute from Dilmun. There are other Assyrian inscriptions during the first millennium BCE indicating Assyrian sovereignty over Dilmun. Dilmun was also later on controlled by the Kassite dynasty in Mesopotamia.

Dilmun, sometimes described as "the place where the sun rises" and "the Land of the Living", is the scene of some versions of the Sumerian creation myth, and the place where the deified Sumerian hero of the flood, Utnapishtim (Ziusudra), was taken by the gods to live forever. Thorkild Jacobsen's translation of the Eridu Genesis calls it "Mount Dilmun" which he locates as a "faraway, half-mythical place".

Dilmun is also described in the epic story of Enki and Ninhursag as the site at which the Creation occurred. The promise of Enki to Ninhursag, the Earth Mother:
For Dilmun, the land of my lady's heart, I will create long waterways, rivers and canals, whereby water will flow to quench the thirst of all beings and bring abundance to all that lives.
Ninlil, the Sumerian goddess of air and south wind had her home in Dilmun. It is also featured in the Epic of Gilgamesh.

However, in the early epic "Enmerkar and the Lord of Aratta", the main events, which center on Enmerkar's construction of the ziggurats in Uruk and Eridu, are described as taking place in a world "before Dilmun had yet been settled".

Gerrha

Gerrha, was an ancient city of Eastern Arabia, on the west side of the Persian Gulf. More accurately, the ancient city of Gerrha has been determined to have existed near or under the present fort of Uqair. This fort is 50 miles northeast of al-Hasa in the Eastern Province of Saudi Arabia. This site was first proposed by Robert Ernest Cheesman in 1924.

Gerrha and Uqair are archaeological sites on the eastern coast of the Arabian Peninsula. Prior to Gerrha, the area belonged to the Dilmun civilization, which was conquered by the Assyrian Empire in 709 BCE.  Gerrha was the center of an Arab kingdom from approximately 650 BCE to circa 300 CE. The kingdom was attacked by Antiochus III the Great in 205-204 BCE, though it seems to have survived. It is currently unknown exactly when Gerrha fell, but the area was under Sassanid Persian control after 300 CE.

Gerrha was described by Strabo as inhabited by Chaldean exiles from Babylon, who built their houses of salt and repaired them by the application of salt water. Pliny the Elder (lust. Nat. vi. 32) says it was 5 miles in circumference with towers built of square blocks of salt.

Gerrha was destroyed by the Qarmatians in the end of the 9th century where all inhabitants were massacred (300,000). It was 2 miles from the Persian Gulf near current day Hofuf. The researcher Abdulkhaliq Al Janbi argued in his book that Gerrha was most likely the ancient city of Hajar, located in modern-day Al Ahsa, Saudi Arabia. Al Janbi's theory is the most widely accepted one by modern scholars, although there are some difficulties with this argument given that Al Ahsa is 60 km inland and thus less likely to be the starting point for a trader's route, making the location within the archipelago of islands comprising the modern Kingdom of Bahrain, particularly the main island of Bahrain itself, another possibility.

Various other identifications of the site have been attempted, Jean Baptiste Bourguignon d'Anville choosing Qatif, Carsten Niebuhr preferring Kuwait and C Forster suggesting the ruins at the head of the bay behind the islands of Bahrain.

Tylos

 
Bahrain was referred to by the Greeks as Tylos, the centre of pearl trading, when Nearchus came to discover it serving under Alexander the Great. From the 6th to 3rd century BCE Bahrain was included in Persian Empire by Achaemenians, an Iranian dynasty. The Greek admiral Nearchus is believed to have been the first of Alexander's commanders to visit this islands, and he found a verdant land that was part of a wide trading network; he recorded: "That in the island of Tylos, situated in the Persian Gulf, are large plantations of cotton tree, from which are manufactured clothes called sindones, a very different degrees of value, some being costly, others less expensive. The use of these is not confined to India, but extends to Arabia." The Greek historian, Theophrastus, states that much of the islands were covered in these cotton trees and that Tylos was famous for exporting walking canes engraved with emblems that were customarily carried in Babylon. Ares was also worshipped by the ancient Baharna and the Greek empires.

It is not known whether Bahrain was part of the Seleucid Empire, although the archaeological site at Qalat Al Bahrain has been proposed as a Seleucid base in the Persian Gulf. Alexander had planned to settle the eastern shores of the Persian Gulf with Greek empires, and although it is not clear that this happened on the scale he envisaged, Tylos was very much part of the Hellenised world: the language of the upper classes was Greek (although Aramaic was in everyday use), while Zeus was worshipped in the form of the Arabian sun-god Shams. Tylos even became the site of Greek athletic contests.

The name Tylos is thought to be a Hellenisation of the Semitic, Tilmun (from Dilmun). The term Tylos was commonly used for the islands until Ptolemy's Geographia when the inhabitants are referred to as 'Thilouanoi'. Some place names in Bahrain go back to the Tylos era, for instance, the residential suburb of Arad in Muharraq, is believed to originate from "Arados", the ancient Greek name for Muharraq island.

Herodotus's account (written c. 440 BCE) refers to the Io and Europa myths. (History, I:1).

Phoenicians Homeland

The Greek historian Strabo believed the Phoenicians originated from Eastern Arabia. Herodotus also believed that the homeland of the Phoenicians was Eastern Arabia. This theory was accepted by the 19th-century German classicist Arnold Heeren who said that: "In the Greek geographers, for instance, we read of two islands, named Tyrus or Tylos, and Arad, Bahrain, which boasted that they were the mother country of the Phoenicians, and exhibited relics of Phoenician temples." The people of Tyre in particular have long maintained Persian Gulf origins, and the similarity in the words "Tylos" and "Tyre" has been commented upon. However, there is little evidence of occupation at all in Bahrain during the time when such migration had supposedly taken place.

With the waning of Seleucid Greek power, Tylos was incorporated into Characene or Mesenian, the state founded in what today is Kuwait by Hyspaosines in 127 BCE. A building inscriptions found in Bahrain indicate that Hyspoasines occupied the islands, (and it also mention his wife, Thalassia).

Parthian and Sassanid
From the 3rd century BCE to arrival of Islam in the 7th century CE, Eastern Arabia was controlled by two other Iranian dynasties of the Parthians and Sassanids.

By about 250 BCE, the Seleucids lost their territories to Parthians, an Iranian tribe from Central Asia. The Parthian dynasty brought the Persian Gulf under their control and extended their influence as far as Oman. Because they needed to control the Persian Gulf trade route, the Parthians established garrisons in the southern coast of Persian Gulf.

In the 3rd century CE, the Sassanids succeeded the Parthians and held the area until the rise of Islam four centuries later. Ardashir, the first ruler of the Iranian Sassanians dynasty marched down the Persian Gulf to Oman and Bahrain and defeated Sanatruq  (or Satiran), probably the Parthian governor of Eastern Arabia. He appointed his son Shapur I as governor of Eastern Arabia. Shapur constructed a new city there and named it Batan Ardashir after his father. At this time, Eastern Arabia incorporated the southern Sassanid province covering the Persian Gulf's southern shore plus the archipelago of Bahrain. The southern province of the Sassanids was subdivided into three districts of Haggar (Hofuf, Saudi Arabia), Batan Ardashir (al-Qatif province, Saudi Arabia), and Mishmahig (Muharraq, Bahrain; also referred to as Samahij) (In Middle-Persian/Pahlavi means "ewe-fish".) which included the Bahrain archipelago that was earlier called Aval. The name, meaning 'ewe-fish' would appear to suggest that the name /Tulos/ is related to Hebrew /ṭāleh/ 'lamb' (Strong's 2924).

Beth Qatraye

The Christian name used for the region encompassing north-eastern Arabia was Beth Qatraye, or "the Isles". The name translates to 'region of the Qataris' in Syriac. It included Bahrain, Tarout Island, Al-Khatt, Al-Hasa, and Qatar.

By the 5th century, Beth Qatraye was a major centre for Nestorian Christianity, which had come to dominate the southern shores of the Persian Gulf. As a sect, the Nestorians were often persecuted as heretics by the Byzantine Empire, but eastern Arabia was outside the Empire's control offering some safety. Several notable Nestorian writers originated from Beth Qatraye, including Isaac of Nineveh, Dadisho Qatraya, Gabriel of Qatar and Ahob of Qatar. Christianity's significance was diminished by the arrival of Islam in Eastern Arabia by 628. In 676, the bishops of Beth Qatraye stopped attending synods; although the practice of Christianity persisted in the region until the late 9th century.

The dioceses of Beth Qatraye did not form an ecclesiastical province, except for a short period during the mid-to-late seventh century. They were instead subject to the Metropolitan of Fars.

Beth Mazunaye

Oman and the United Arab Emirates comprised the ecclesiastical province known as Beth Mazunaye. The name was derived from 'Mazun', the Persian name for Oman and the United Arab Emirates.

South Arabian Kingdoms

Kingdom of Ma'īn (10th century BCE – 150 BCE)

During Minaean rule, the capital was at Karna (now known as Sa'dah). Their other important city was Yathill (now known as Baraqish). The Minaean Kingdom was centered in northwestern Yemen, with most of its cities lying along Wādī Madhab. Minaean inscriptions have been found far afield of the Kingdom of Maīin, as far away as al-'Ula in northwestern Saudi Arabia and even on the island of Delos and Egypt. It was the first of the Yemeni kingdoms to end, and the Minaean language died around 100 CE .

Kingdom of Saba (12th century BCE – 7th century CE)

During Sabaean rule, trade and agriculture flourished, generating much wealth and prosperity. The Sabaean kingdom was located in Yemen, and its capital, Ma'rib, is located near what is now Yemen's modern capital, Sana'a. According to South Arabian tradition, the eldest son of Noah, Shem, founded the city of Ma'rib.

During Sabaean rule, Yemen was called "Arabia Felix" by the Romans, who were impressed by its wealth and prosperity. The Roman emperor Augustus sent a military expedition to conquer the "Arabia Felix", under the command of Aelius Gallus. After an unsuccessful siege of Ma'rib, the Roman general retreated to Egypt, while his fleet destroyed the port of Aden in order to guarantee the Roman merchant route to India.

The success of the kingdom was based on the cultivation and trade of spices and aromatics including frankincense and myrrh. These were exported to the Mediterranean, India, and Abyssinia, where they were greatly prized by many cultures, using camels on routes through Arabia, and to India by sea.

During the 8th and 7th century BCE, there was a close contact of cultures between the Kingdom of Dʿmt in Eritrea and northern Ethiopia and Saba. Though the civilization was indigenous and the royal inscriptions were written in a sort of proto-Ethiosemitic, there were also some Sabaean immigrants in the kingdom as evidenced by a few of the Dʿmt inscriptions.

Agriculture in Yemen thrived during this time due to an advanced irrigation system which consisted of large water tunnels in mountains, and dams.

Kingdom of Hadhramaut (8th century BCE – 3rd century CE)

The first known inscriptions of Hadramaut are known from the 8th century BCE. It was first referenced by an outside civilization in an Old Sabaic inscription of Karab'il Watar from the early 7th century BCE, in which the King of Hadramaut, Yada`'il, is mentioned as being one of his allies. When the Minaeans took control of the caravan routes in the 4th century BCE, however, Hadramaut became one of its confederates, probably because of commercial interests. It later became independent and was invaded by the growing Yemeni kingdom of Himyar toward the end of the 1st century BCE, but it was able to repel the attack. Hadramaut annexed Qataban in the second half of the 2nd century CE, reaching its greatest size. The kingdom of Hadramaut was eventually conquered by the Himyarite king Shammar Yahri'sh around 300 CE, unifying all of the South Arabian kingdoms.

Kingdom of Awsān (8th century BCE – 6th century BCE)

The ancient Kingdom of Awsān in South Arabia (modern Yemen), with a capital at Ḥagar Yaḥirr in the wadi Markhah, to the south of the Wādī Bayḥān, is now marked by a tell or artificial mound, which is locally named Ḥajar Asfal.

Kingdom of Qataban (4th century BCE – 3rd century CE)

Qataban was one of the ancient Yemeni kingdoms which thrived in the Beihan valley. Like the other Southern Arabian kingdoms, it gained great wealth from the trade of frankincense and myrrh incense, which were burned at altars. The capital of Qataban was named Timna and was located on the trade route which passed through the other kingdoms of Hadramaut, Saba and Ma'in. The chief deity of the Qatabanians was Amm, or "Uncle" and the people called themselves the "children of Amm".

Kingdom of Himyar (late 2nd century BCE – 525 CE)

The Himyarites rebelled against Qataban and eventually united Southwestern Arabia (Hejaz and Yemen), controlling the Red Sea as well as the coasts of the Gulf of Aden. From their capital city, Ẓafār, the Himyarite kings launched successful military campaigns, and had stretched its domain at times as far east as eastern Yemen and as far north as Najran Together with their Kindite allies, it extended maximally as far north as Riyadh and as far east as Yabrīn.

During the 3rd century CE, the South Arabian kingdoms were in continuous conflict with one another. Gadarat (GDRT) of Aksum began to interfere in South Arabian affairs, signing an alliance with Saba, and a Himyarite text notes that Hadramaut and Qataban were also allied against the kingdom. As a result of this, the Aksumite Empire was able to capture the Himyarite capital of Thifar in the first quarter of the 3rd century. However, the alliances did not last, and Sha`ir Awtar of Saba unexpectedly turned on Hadramaut, allying again with Aksum and taking its capital in 225. Himyar then allied with Saba and invaded the newly taken Aksumite territories, retaking Thifar, which had been under the control of Gadarat's son Beygat, and pushing Aksum back into the Tihama. The standing relief image of a crowned man, is taken to be a representation possibly of the Jewish king Malkīkarib Yuhaʾmin or more likely the Christian Esimiphaios (Samu Yafa').

Aksumite occupation of Yemen (525 – 570 CE)

The Aksumite intervention is connected with Dhu Nuwas, a Himyarite king who changed the state religion to Judaism and began to persecute the Christians in Yemen. Outraged, Kaleb, the Christian King of Aksum with the encouragement of the Byzantine Emperor Justin I invaded and annexed Yemen. The Aksumites controlled Himyar and attempted to invade Mecca in the year 570 CE. Eastern Yemen remained allied to the Sassanids via tribal alliances with the Lakhmids, which later brought the Sassanid army into Yemen, ending the Aksumite period.

Sassanid period (570 – 630 CE)

The Persian king Khosrau I sent troops under the command of Vahriz, who helped the semi-legendary Sayf ibn Dhi Yazan to drive the Aksumites out of Yemen. Southern Arabia became a Persian dominion under a Yemenite vassal and thus came within the sphere of influence of the Sassanid Empire. After the demise of the Lakhmids, another army was sent to Yemen, making it a province of the Sassanid Empire under a Persian satrap. Following the death of Khosrau II in 628, the Persian governor in Southern Arabia, Badhan, converted to Islam and Yemen followed the new religion.

Hejaz

Kingdom of Lihyan/Dedan (7th century BCE - 24 BC)

Lihyan,  also called Dadān or Dedan, was a powerful and highly organized ancient Arab kingdom that played a vital cultural and economic role in the north-western region of the Arabian Peninsula and used Dadanitic language.  The Lihyanite kingdom went through three different stages, the early phase of Lihyan Kingdom was around the 7th century BC, started as a Sheikdom of Dedan then developed into the Kingdom of Lihyan tribe. 
Some authors assert that the Lihyanites fell into the hands of the Nabataeans around 65 BC upon their seizure of Hegra then marching to Tayma, and finally to their capital Dedan in 9 BC. Werner Cascel consider the Nabataean annexation of Lihyan was around 24 BC under the reign of the Nabataeans king Aretas IV.

Thamud

The Thamud was an ancient civilization in Hejaz, which flourished kingdom from 3000 BCE to 200 BCE. Recent archaeological work has revealed numerous Thamudic rock writings and pictures. They are mentioned in sources such as the Qur'an, old Arabian poetry, Assyrian annals (Tamudi), in a Greek temple inscription from the northwest Hejaz of 169 CE, in a 5th-century Byzantine source and in Old North Arabian graffiti within Tayma. They are also mentioned in the victory annals of the Neo-Assyrian King, Sargon II (8th century BCE), who defeated these people in a campaign in northern Arabia. The Greeks also refer to these people as "Tamudaei", i.e. "Thamud", in the writings of Aristotle, Ptolemy, and Pliny. Before the rise of Islam, approximately between 400 and 600 CE, the Thamud completely disappeared.

North Arabian kingdoms

Kingdom of Qedar (8th century BCE – ?)

The most organized of the Northern Arabian tribes, at the height of their rule in the 6th century BCE, the Kingdom of Qedar spanned a large area between the Persian Gulf and the Sinai. An influential force between the 8th and 4th centuries BCE, Qedarite monarchs are first mentioned in inscriptions from the Assyrian Empire. Some early Qedarite rulers were vassals of that empire, with revolts against Assyria becoming more common in the 7th century BCE. It is thought that the Qedarites were eventually subsumed into the Nabataean state after their rise to prominence in the 2nd century CE.

The Achaemenids in Northern Arabia

Achaemenid Arabia corresponded to the lands between Nile Delta (Egypt) and Mesopotamia, later known to Romans as Arabia Petraea. According to Herodotus, Cambyses did not subdue the Arabs when he attacked Egypt in 525 BCE. His successor Darius the Great does not mention the Arabs in the Behistun inscription from the first years of his reign, but does mention them in later texts. This suggests that Darius might have conquered this part of Arabia or that it was originally part of another province, perhaps Achaemenid Babylonia, but later became its own province.

Arabs were not considered as subjects to the Achaemenids, as other peoples were, and were exempt from taxation. Instead, they simply provided 1,000 talents of frankincense a year. 
They participated in the Second Persian invasion of Greece (479-480 BCE) while also helping the Achaemenids invade Egypt by providing water skins to the troops crossing the desert.

Nabateans

The Nabataeans are not to be found among the tribes that are listed in Arab genealogies because the Nabatean kingdom ended a long time before the coming of Islam. They settled east of the Syro-African rift between the Dead Sea and the Red Sea, that is, in the land that had once been Edom. And although the first sure reference to them dates from 312 BCE, it is possible that they were present much earlier.

It came into prominence in the late 1st century BCE through the success of the spice trade. The city was the principal city of ancient Nabataea and was famous above all for two things: its trade and its hydraulic engineering systems. It was locally autonomous until the reign of Trajan, but it flourished under Roman rule. The town grew up around its Colonnaded Street in the 1st century and by the middle of the 1st century had witnessed rapid urbanization. The quarries were probably opened in this period, and there followed virtually continuous building through the 1st and 2nd centuries CE.

Roman Arabia

There is evidence of Roman rule in northern Arabia dating to the reign of Caesar Augustus (27 BCE – 14 CE). During the reign of Tiberius (14–37 CE), the already wealthy and elegant north Arabian city of Palmyra, located along the caravan routes linking Persia with the Mediterranean ports of Roman Syria and Phoenicia, was made part of the Roman province of Syria. The area steadily grew further in importance as a trade route linking Persia, India, China, and the Roman Empire. During the following period of great prosperity, the Arab citizens of Palmyra adopted customs and modes of dress from both the Iranian Parthian world to the east and the Graeco-Roman west. In 129, Hadrian visited the city and was so enthralled by it that he proclaimed it a free city and renamed it Palmyra Hadriana.
 
The Roman province of Arabia Petraea was created at the beginning of the 2nd century by emperor Trajan. It was centered on Petra, but included even areas of northern Arabia under Nabatean control.

Recently evidence has been discovered that Roman legions occupied Mada'in Saleh in the Hijaz mountains area of northwestern Arabia, increasing the extension of the "Arabia Petraea" province.

The desert frontier of Arabia Petraea was called by the Romans the Limes Arabicus. As a frontier province, it included a desert area of northeastern Arabia populated by the nomadic Saraceni.

Qahtanites

In Sassanid times, Arabia Petraea was a border province between the Roman and Persian empires, and from the early centuries CE was increasingly affected by South Arabian influence, notably with the Ghassanids migrating north from the 3rd century.

The Ghassanids revived the Semitic presence in the then Hellenized Syria. They mainly settled the Hauran region and spread to modern Lebanon, Israel, Palestine and Jordan. The Ghassanids held Syria until engulfed by the expansion of Islam.

Greeks and Romans referred to all the nomadic population of the desert in the Near East as Arabi. The Greeks called Yemen "Arabia Felix" (Happy Arabia). The Romans called the vassal nomadic states within the Roman Empire "Arabia Petraea" after the city of Petra, and called unconquered deserts bordering the empire to the south and east Arabia Magna (Larger Arabia) or Arabia Deserta (Deserted Arabia).
The Lakhmids settled the mid Tigris region around their capital Al-Hirah they ended up allying with the Sassanid against the Ghassanids and the Byzantine Empire. The Lakhmids contested control of the central Arabian tribes with the Kindites, eventually destroying Kindah in 540 after the fall of Kindah's main ally at the time, Himyar. The Sassanids dissolved the Lakhmid kingdom in 602.
The Kindites migrated from Yemen along with the Ghassanids and Lakhmids, but were turned back in Bahrain by the Abdul Qais Rabi'a tribe. They returned to Yemen and allied themselves with the Himyarites who installed them as a vassal kingdom that ruled Central Arabia from Qaryah dhat Kahl (the present-day Qaryat al-Fāw) in Central Arabia. They ruled much of the Northern/Central Arabian Peninsula until the fall of the Himyarites in 525 CE.

Central Arabia

Kingdom of Kindah

Kindah was an Arab kingdom by the Kindah tribe, the tribe's existence dates back to the second century BCE. The Kindites established a kingdom in Najd in central Arabia unlike the organized states of Yemen; its kings exercised an influence over a number of associated tribes more by personal prestige than by coercive settled authority. Their first capital was Qaryat Dhāt Kāhil, today known as Qaryat Al-Fāw.

The Kindites were polytheistic until the 6th century CE, with evidence of rituals dedicated to the idols Athtar and Kāhil found in their ancient capital in south-central Arabia (present day Saudi Arabia). It is not clear whether they converted to Judaism or remained pagan, but there is a strong archaeological evidence that they were among the tribes in Dhū Nuwās' forces during the Jewish king's attempt to suppress Christianity in Yemen. They converted to Islam in mid 7th century CE and played a crucial role during the Arab conquest of their surroundings, although some sub-tribes declared apostasy during the ridda after the death of Muḥammad.

Ancient South Arabian inscriptions mention a tribe settling in Najd called kdt, who had a king called rbˁt (Rabi'ah) from ḏw ṯwr-m (the people of Thawr), who had sworn allegiance to the king of Saba' and Dhū Raydān. Since later Arab genealogists trace Kindah back to a person called Thawr ibn 'Uqayr, modern historians have concluded that this rbˁt ḏw ṯwrm (Rabī'ah of the People of Thawr) must have been a king of Kindah (kdt); the Musnad inscriptions mention that he was king both of kdt (Kindah) and qhtn (Qaḥṭān). They played a major role in the Himyarite-Ḥaḑramite war. Following the Himyarite victory, a branch of Kindah established themselves in the Marib region, while the majority of Kindah remained in their lands in central Arabia.

The first Classical author to mention Kindah was the Byzantine ambassador Nonnosos, who was sent by the Emperor Justinian to the area. He refers to the people in Greek as Khindynoi (Greek Χινδηνοι, Arabic Kindah), and mentions that they and the tribe of Maadynoi (Greek: Μααδηνοι, Arabic: Ma'ad) were the two most important tribes in the area in terms of territory and number. He calls the king of Kindah Kaïsos (Greek: Καισος, Arabic: Qays), the nephew of Aretha (Greek: Άρεθα, Arabic: Ḥārith).

People

Sedentary Arabs

Sedentary Arabs who inhabited cities or rural areas (towns, villages or oases). In pre-Islamic Arabia, most sedentary Arabs were of Arabian origin.

Bedouin tribes
Consisted of many major ancient tribes and clans which were mainly pastoral nomads. The ancestral lineage followed through males, since the tribes and clans were named after the male ancestors.

Solluba

The Solluba were a Ḥutaymi tribal group in the northern part of the Arabian Peninsula who were clearly distinguishable from the Arabs. The Solubba maintained a distinctive lifestyle as isolated nomads. The origin of the Solluba is obscure. They have been identified with the Selappayu in Akkadian records, and a clue to their origin is their use of desert kites and game traps, first attested to in around 7,000 BCE, which makes them the pre-Semitic inhabitants of Arabia.

Cambridge linguist and anthropologist Roger Blench sees the Solubba as the last survivors of Palaeolithic hunters and salt-traders who once dominated Arabia. Those were assimilated in the next wave of humans consisted of cattle herders in the 6th millennium BCE who introduced cows, wild donkeys, sheep, dogs, camels and goats. Those peoples may have engaged in trade across the Red Sea with speakers of Cushitic or Nilo-Saharan. In the 3rd and 2nd millennium BCE, speakers of Semitic languages arrived from the Near East and marginalised and absorbed the rest.

Western travelers reported that the Bedouin did not consider the Solluba to be descendants of Qaḥṭān. One legend mentions that they originated from ancient Christian groups, possibly Crusaders who were taken into slavery by the Bedouin. Werner Caskel criticizes the Crusader origin theory and instead proposes that the term "Solluba" describes a host of groups hailing from different backgrounds: those of al-Ḥasā being of 12th- to 13th-century CE migrants from southern Persia, and the group to the west being composed of communities emerging after their defeat by the Wahhabis.
Another theory sees the Solubba as a former Bedouin group that lost their herds and fell in the eyes of other Bedouin.

Arab genealogical tradition

Arab traditions relating to the origins and classification of the Arabian tribes is based on biblical genealogy. The general consensus among 14th-century Arabic genealogists was that Arabs were three kinds:
"Perishing Arabs": These are the ancients of whose history little is known. They include ʿĀd, Thamud, Tasm, Jadis, Imlaq and others. Jadis and Tasm perished because of genocide. ʿĀd and Thamud perished because of their decadence. Some people in the past doubted their existence, but Imlaq is the singular form of 'Amaleeq and is probably synonymous to the biblical Amalek.
"Pure Arabs" (Qahtanite): These are traditionally considered to have originated from the progeny of Ya'rub bin Yashjub bin Qahtan so were also called Qahtanite Arabs.
"Arabized Arabs" (Adnanite): They are traditionally seen as having descended from Adnan.

Modern historians believe that these distinctions were created during the Umayyad period, to support the cause of different political factions.

The several different tribes throughout Arabian history are traditionally regarded as having emerged from two main branches: the Rabi`ah, from which amongst others the Banu Hanifa emerged, and the Mudhar, from which amongst others the Banu Kinanah (and later Muhammad's own tribe, the Quraysh) emerged.

Religion

Religion in pre-Islamic Arabia included pre-Islamic Arabian polytheism, ancient Semitic religions (religions predating the  Abrahamic religions which themselves likewise originated among the ancient Semitic-speaking peoples), Abrahamic religions such as Christianity, Judaism, Samaritanism, and Mandaeism, and Iranian religions such as Zoroastrianism and Manichaeism, as well as Dharmic religions such as Buddhism. Arabian polytheism was, according to Islamic tradition, the dominant form of religion in pre-Islamic Arabia, based on veneration of deities and spirits. Worship was directed to various gods and goddesses, including Hubal and the goddesses al-Lāt, Al-'Uzzá and Manāt, at local shrines and temples, maybe such as the Kaaba in Mecca. Deities were venerated and invoked through a variety of rituals, including pilgrimages and divination, as well as ritual sacrifice. Different theories have been proposed regarding the role of Allah in Meccan religion. Many of the physical descriptions of the pre-Islamic gods are traced to idols, especially near the Kaaba, which is said to have contained up to 360 of them in Islamic tradition.

Other religions were represented to varying, lesser degrees. The influence of the adjacent Roman and Aksumite resulted in Christian communities in the northwest, northeast and south of Arabia. Christianity made a lesser impact, but secured some conversions, in the remainder of the peninsula. With the exception of Nestorianism in the northeast and the Persian Gulf, the dominant form of Christianity was Miaphysitism. The peninsula had been a destination for Jewish migration since pre-Roman times, which had resulted in a diaspora community supplemented by local converts. Additionally, the influence of the Sasanian Empire resulted in Iranian religions being present in the peninsula. While Zoroastrianism existed in the eastern and southern Arabia, there was no existence of Manichaeism in Mecca. Buddhism is also but rarely practiced as well.

Art

The art is similar to that of neighbouring cultures. Pre-Islamic Yemen produced stylized alabaster (the most common material for sculpture) heads of great aesthetic and historic charm.

Late Antiquity

The early 7th century in Arabia began with the longest and most destructive period of the Byzantine–Sassanid Wars. It left both the Byzantine and Sassanid empires exhausted and susceptible to third-party attacks, particularly from nomadic Arabs united under a newly formed religion. According to historian George Liska, the "unnecessarily prolonged Byzantine–Persian conflict opened the way for Islam".

The demographic situation also favoured Arab expansion: overpopulation and lack of resources encouraged Arabs to migrate out of Arabia.

Fall of the Empires
Before the Byzantine–Sassanid War of 602–628, the Plague of Justinian had erupted (541-542), spreading through Persia and into Byzantine territory. The Byzantine historian Procopius, who witnessed the plague, documented that citizens died at a rate of 10,000 per day in Constantinople. The exact number; however, is often disputed by contemporary historians. Both empires were permanently weakened by the pandemic as their citizens struggled to deal with death as well as heavy taxation, which increased as each empire campaigned for more territory.

Despite almost succumbing to the plague, Byzantine emperor Justinian I (reigned 527–565) attempted to resurrect the might of the Roman Empire by expanding into Arabia. The Arabian Peninsula had a long coastline for merchant ships and an area of lush vegetation known as the Fertile Crescent which could help fund his expansion into Europe and North Africa. The drive into Persian territory would also put an end to tribute payments to the Sasanians, which resulted in an agreement to give  of tribute to the Persians annually in exchange for a ceasefire.

However, Justinian could not afford further losses in Arabia. The Byzantines and the Sasanians sponsored powerful nomadic mercenaries from the desert with enough power to trump the possibility of aggression in Arabia. Justinian viewed his mercenaries as so valued for preventing conflict that he awarded their chief with the titles of patrician, phylarch, and king – the highest honours that he could bestow on anyone. By the late 6th century, an uneasy peace remained until disagreements erupted between the mercenaries and their patron empires.

The Byzantines' ally was a Christian Arabic tribe from the frontiers of the desert known as the Ghassanids. The Sasanians' ally; the Lakhmids, were also Christian Arabs, but from what is now Iraq. However, denominational disagreements about God forced a schism in the alliances. The Byzantines' official religion was Orthodox Christianity, which believed that Jesus Christ and God were two natures within one entity. The Ghassanids, as Monophysite Christians from Iraq, believed that God and Jesus Christ were only one nature. This disagreement proved irreconcilable and resulted in a permanent break in the alliance.

Meanwhile, the Sassanid Empire broke its alliance with the Lakhmids due to false accusations that the Lakhmids' leader had committed treason; the Sasanians annexed the Lakhmid kingdom in 602. The fertile lands and important trade routes of Iraq were now open ground for upheaval.

Rise of Islam

When the military stalemate was finally broken and it seemed that Byzantium had finally gained the upper hand in battle, nomadic Arabs invaded from the desert frontiers, bringing with them a new social order that emphasized religious devotion over tribal membership.

By the time the last Byzantine-Sassanid war came to an end in 628, Arabia had started to unite under Muhammad's politico-religious leadership. The Muslims were able to launch attacks against both empires, which resulted in destruction of the Sassanid Empire and the conquest of Byzantium's territories in the Levant, the Caucasus, Egypt, Syria and North Africa.

"Within the lifetime of some of the children who met Muhammad and sat on the Prophet's knees, Arab armies controlled the land mass that extended from the Pyrenees Mountains in Europe to the Indus River valley in South Asia. In less than a century, Arabs had come to rule over an area that spanned five thousand miles."

Recent discoveries 
On 9 June 2020, the discovery of a 35-meter long triangular megalithic monument in Dumat al-Jandal dated back to VI millennium BC which presumably dedicated to ritual practices was published in the journal Antiquity. Archaeological researchers from France, Saudi Arabia and Italy, headed by Olivia Munoz believe that these findings illuminate a pastoralist nomadic lifestyle and a ritual used in prehistoric Arabia.

See also

 Ancient Near East
 Arab (etymology)
 Arabian mythology
 Dilmun
 History of Saudi Arabia
 History of Bahrain
 History of the Arabic alphabet
 History of the United Arab Emirates
 Incense Route
 Jahiliyyah
 Pre-Islamic Arab trade
 Pre-Islamic calendar
 Rahmanism
 Soviet Orientalist studies in Islam
 Women in pre-Islamic Arabia

Notes

Bibliography

Further reading

 Arabia Antica: Portal of Pre-Islamic Arabian Studies, University of Pisa - Dipartimento Civiltà e Forme del Sapere

External links
Internet Medieval Sourcebook: Pre-Islamic Arabia: The Hanged Poems, before 622 CE
Ancient History Sourcebook: Ancient Accounts of Arabia, 430 BCE - 550 CE

 
History of Saudi Arabia